"Some Cut" is a song recorded by American hip hop group Trillville featuring guest vocals by rapper Cutty Cartel. The track was released as the second single from Trillville's debut album, The King of Crunk & BME Present: Trillville & Lil Scrappy (2004). "Some Cut" was the group's biggest hit single; it peaked at number fourteen on the Billboard Hot 100 in 2005. The song was a popular ringtone for mobile phones in the U.S. at the time of its release; it was certified platinum by the Recording Industry Association of America on the strength of those sales in 2006.

The song's beat, developed by American producer Lil Jon, is built around a sample of a squeaking chair,  purported to sound like a mattress creaking during sex. Consequently, Trillville's lyrics take a sexually explicit approach. The song was recorded in Atlanta, Georgia, and is an example the city's club-oriented crunk subgenre, popularized by Lil Jon in the 2000s. Its distinctive squeak sample has been referenced by several international pop and rap artists, particularly among Korean pop groups.

Background
The song's beat was created by American producer Lil Jon, who had discovered Trillville at a sold-out concert several years prior. It was recorded at Stankonia Recording in Atlanta, Georgia. Jon reminisced on the song's development in a 2018 interview with Rolling Stone:

Reception and legacy
The song was well received. David Jeffries at AllMusic called the song's backbeat "a brilliant bit of production from Lil Jon."
Elias Leight at Rolling Stone referred to the single as "crunk landmark." The song's distinctive bedspring noise has been imitated in several songs, including those by fellow rap artists Drake, Wale and Ty Dolla $ign, and by international pop artists such as Tinashe, Karol G, Bruno Mars, and Jacquees. Leight notes the sample is particularly popular in Korean pop music, where it is referred to in songs by artists like NCT 127, Exo, and Shinee.

A remix with rappers Pitbull and Snoop Dogg was also released in 2004.

Chart performance
The song reached #14 on the Billboard Hot 100, #7 on the R&B/Hip-Hop Songs chart, and #3 on the Rap Songs chart. The song made it on the Billboard Year-End Hot 100 singles of 2005 at number 49.

Music video
The song's music video starts with Trillville buying a house from the owners, and they throw a house party. Trillville and Lil Jon sell the house a day later after the house party. E-40, Lil Jon, and Porsha Williams make appearances.

Personnel
Credits adapted from the liner notes for The King of Crunk & BME Present: Trillville & Lil Scrappy.

Jonathan Smith – production, mixing, songwriting
Donnell Prince – songwriting
Lawrence Edwards – songwriting
Jamal Glaze – songwriting
Craig Love – songwriting, guitar
LaMarquis Jefferson – songwriting, bass guitar
John Frye – mixing
Warren Bletcher – assistant mixing

Charts

Weekly charts

Year-end charts

Release history

References

2004 singles
Song recordings produced by Lil Jon
2004 songs
Southern hip hop songs
Songs written by Lil Jon
Crunk songs
Dirty rap songs